The 1974 Cal State Fullerton Titans football team represented California State University, Fullerton as a member of the Pacific Coast Athletic Association (PCAA) during the 1974 NCAA Division I football season. This was Cal State Fullerton's first year competing at the NCAA Division I level and as a member of the PCAA, but the Titans' games against conference opponents did not count in the conference standings until the 1975 season. They had previously been in the California Collegiate Athletic Association (CCAA). Led by third-year head coach Pete Yoder, Cal State Fullerton compiled an overall record 4–7. The Titans played home games at Santa Ana Stadium in Santa Ana, California.

Schedule

Team players in the NFL
No Cal State Fullerton Titans were selected in the 1975 NFL Draft.

The following finished their college career in 1974, were not drafted, but played in the NFL.

References

Cal State Fullerton
Cal State Fullerton Titans football seasons
Cal State Fullerton Titans football